Sar Kalateh may refer to:
 Sar Kalateh-ye Kafshgiri
 Sar Kalateh-ye Kharab Shahr